James Gregor Mackenzie (15 November 1927 – 4 May 1992) was a British Labour Party politician.

Early life
Mackenzie was educated at the Royal Technical College and the University of Glasgow. He became a sales manager and a councillor on Glasgow Corporation from 1952.

Political career
Mackenzie contested Aberdeenshire East in 1950 and Kinross and Western Perthshire in 1959.
He became Member of Parliament for Glasgow Rutherglen at a 1964 by-election (where he narrowly beat Norman Buchan at the Labour Party selection meeting).  He served until his retirement at the 1987 general election. He was Parliamentary Private Secretary to the Chancellor of the Exchequer from 1966. In the 1970s he served as a minister at the Department of Industry and the Scottish Office.

References
Times Guide to the House of Commons 1983
Whitaker's Almanack 1993

External links 

1927 births
1992 deaths
Scottish Labour MPs
Councillors in Glasgow
UK MPs 1959–1964
UK MPs 1964–1966
UK MPs 1966–1970
UK MPs 1970–1974
UK MPs 1974
UK MPs 1974–1979
UK MPs 1979–1983
UK MPs 1983–1987
Members of the Privy Council of the United Kingdom
Scottish Labour councillors
Alumni of the University of Glasgow
Rutherglen